is a passenger railway station in the city of Tatebayashi, Gunma, Japan, operated by the private railway operator Tōbu Railway.

Lines

Station layout
The station consists of one island platform, connected to the station building by an underground passageway.

Platforms

Adjacent stations

History
The first station was opened as a station of the Koizumi Line operated by Jōshū Railway company on April 10, 1926. The Koizumi Line was purchased by Tōbu Railway in 1937. The station was moved to its current location on February 10, 1944.

From 17 March 2012, station numbering was introduced on all Tōbu lines, with Narushima Station becoming "TI-41".

Passenger statistics
In fiscal 2019, the station was used by an average of 982 passengers daily (boarding passengers only).

Surrounding area
 Tatebayashi High School
 Kanto Junior College
Tatebayshi Narushima Post Office

References

External links

  Tobu station information 
	

Tobu Koizumi Line
Stations of Tobu Railway
Railway stations in Gunma Prefecture
Railway stations in Japan opened in 1926
Tatebayashi, Gunma